The Elsighorn is a mountain in the Bernese Alps, overlooking Kandergrund in the Bernese Oberland.

References

External links
 Elsighorn on Hikr

Mountains of the Alps
Mountains of Switzerland
Mountains of the canton of Bern
Two-thousanders of Switzerland